The Virginia Department of Wildlife Resources is a department of the government of the U.S. state of Virginia that regulates wildlife conservation.

History
The Virginia Department of Game and Inland Fisheries was created on June 17, 1916, under the Commission of Fisheries with M.D. "Mac" Hart appointed as Secretary of the Department. A Virginia hunting license was established as one of the primary sources of funding as the agency is fully self-sufficient and receiving no financial support from the state treasury. From 1903 until this point the Game Wardens had been administered by each locality. In 1920, the first Virginia State Game Farm of 1200 acres was established at Windsor Shades in New Kent County. In 1923, Mrs B. M. Miller and Mrs. C. E. Sykes are recognized among Virginia's first women game wardens. In 1926, the Department was separated from the Commission of Fisheries and reorganized into the Commission of Game and Inland Fisheries chaired by A. Willis Robertson. In 1928 the Commission of Game and Inland Fisheries was given sole authority to shorten hunting seasons, removing the privilege from the localities to adjust their own season. In 1982, Virginia Game Wardens were given full law enforcement authority. In 1987, the commission's name returns to become the Department of Game and Inland Fisheries.

On July 1, 2020, the Department's name was changed to Department of Wildlife Resources.

Conservation police officers 

The law enforcement officers of the department have the title conservation police officer. Conservation police officers enforce Virginia laws relating to hunting, fishing, and boating; conduct patrols in cars, aircraft, all-terrain vehicles, and boats, and on foot; and investigate tips from the public. Virginia conservation police officers are also appointed as deputy U.S. Fish and Wildlife Service special agents, which allows them to investigate (and cross state lines to investigate) suspected violations of federal wildlife laws. Virginia game wardens were first appointed in 1903. The title was changed to "conservation police officer" in 2007.

Since the establishment of the department, eleven officers have died while on duty. In the 1920s and 1930s, five game wardens died from gunfire, and two game wardens died from drowning/pneumonia. Two additional officers were fatally shot in 1952 and 1960. On December 19, 1972, two game wardens died in an aircraft accident.

See also

 List of law enforcement agencies in Virginia
 Virginia Wildlife Management Areas
 List of state and territorial fish and wildlife management agencies in the United States

References

External links
Official website
Relevant part of the Code of Virginia

Wildlife Resources, Department of
State environmental protection agencies of the United States
Wildlife Resources, Department of
1916 establishments in Virginia